Cynoscion is a genus of fish in the drum family, Sciaenidae. It contains the weakfish and seatrouts.

Species 
The genus consists of 24 species:
 Cynoscion acoupa (Lacepède, 1801) -- Acoupa weakfish 
 Cynoscion albus (Günther, 1864) -- Whitefin weakfish 
 Cynoscion analis (Jenyns, 1842) -- Peruvian weakfish 
 Cynoscion arenarius (Ginsburg, 1930) -- Sand seatrout 
 Cynoscion jamaicensis (Vaillant and Bocourt, 1883) -- Jamaica weakfish 
 Cynoscion leiarchus (Cuvier in Cuvier and Valenciennes, 1830) -- Smooth weakfish 
 Cynoscion microlepidotus (Cuvier in Cuvier and Valenciennes, 1830) -- Smallscale weakfish 
 Cynoscion nannus (Castro-Aguirre and Arvizu-Martinez, 1976) -- Dwarf weakfish 
 Cynoscion nebulosus (Cuvier in Cuvier and Valenciennes, 1830) -- Spotted seatrout 
 Cynoscion nortoni (Béarez, 2001) -- Hake weakfish 
 Cynoscion nothus (Holbrook, 1848) -- Silver seatrout 
 Cynoscion othonopterus (Jordan and Gilbert, 1882) -- Gulf weakfish 
 Cynoscion parvipinnis (Ayres, 1861) -- Shortfin corvina 
 Cynoscion phoxocephalus (Jordan and Gilbert, 1882) -- Cachema weakfish 
 Cynoscion praedatorius (Jordan and Gilbert in Jordan and Eigenmann, 1889) -- Boccone weakfish 
 Cynoscion regalis (Bloch and Schneider, 1801) -- Weakfish 
 Cynoscion reticulatus (Günther, 1864)
 Cynoscion similis (Randall and Cervigón, 1968)
 Cynoscion squamipinnis (Günther, 1867) -- Scalyfin corvina
 Cynoscion steindachneri (Jordan in Jordan and Eigenmann, 1889)
 Cynoscion stolzmanni (Steindachner, 1879) -- Yellowtail corvina
 Cynoscion striatus (also named Cynoscion Guatucupa) (Cuvier, 1829)
 Cynoscion virescens (Cuvier in Cuvier and Valenciennes, 1830)
 Cynoscion xanthulus

References

Sciaenidae